The Gier is a French river that flows in a northeast direction through the Loire and Rhône departments. It is a tributary of the Rhône, which it enters from the right bank. The Gier valley was formerly heavily industrialized with coal and iron mines and factories.

Name

The word "Gier" derives from the Latin Jaresis, which also gave rise to the name côté Jarez for the north side of the valley of the Gier,
and is included in the names of several municipalities: Sainte-Croix-en-Jarez, Saint-Paul-en-Jarez, Saint-Romain-en-Jarez, La Tour-en-Jarez, Saint-Christo-en-Jarez, Rive-de-Gier and Saint-Romain-en-Gier.

Geography

The "Saut du Gier" waterfall near the head of the river is in the Pilat Regional Natural Park.
The river runs for  before joining the Rhône at Givors. The Gier receives the Janon from its left at Saint-Chamond. 
The Janon from Terrenoire (now part of Saint-Étienne) to Saint-Chamond, and then the Gier from Saint-Chamond to Givors, create a valley in the coal basin between the Pilat massif to the south and the Riverie chain of the Monts du Lyonnais to the north.

The right (south) side of the valley is mountainous, mainly covered with trees or pasture, with relatively few people.
The right bank streams flow from the Pilat massif. They are the Janon, upstream Gier, Onzion, Dorlay, Egarande, Couzon, Grand Malval, Mezerin and Combe de l'Enfer.

The left (north) side of the valley is hilly, sandy terrain. 
The left bank streams flow from the Monts du Lyonnais. 
They are the Langonand, which flows into the Janon, Mornante, Ruisseau des Arcs, Faverge, Durèze, Collenon, Féloin and Bozançon.
The Bozançon defines the border on the Jarez side between the Loire and Rhone departments.

There are dams on the upper Gier, the Dorlay and the Couzon.

Hydrology

The throughput of the Gier was observed over a period of 45 years (1964–2008) at Givors, a city of the Rhône department located at the confluence of the Rhône.
The average rainfall in the Gier watershed is  annually, much lower than the overall average for France.

Gier has seasonal fluctuations typical of rivers of the French Massif Central that are partly fed by melting snow. 

Significant floods are quite common.
J. B. Chambeyron, the historian of Rive-de-Gier, talks of a flood in 1684 where the waters from Saint-Chamond to Givors rose to the first floor above ground level.
while the maximum daily value was  the same day.
During the night of 1–2 November 2008 the center of Rive-de-Gier was devastated by flooding, as were many surrounding towns such as Saint-Romain-en-Gier and Givors. 

History

In Roman times the river was used to supply water to Lugdunum (old Lyon) through the aqueduct of the Gier.

The opening of the Givors canal from Rive-de-Gier to Givors in 1781 contributed to the early industrialization of the valley.
The Saint-Étienne–Lyon railway was opened in 1833, the first French railway open to travelers.
It follows the path of the Janon from Terrenoire to Saint-Chamond, and then the Gier to the Rhone.
In the 19th and 20th centuries the Gier brought water and energy to many factories in the Gier valley.
In the 19th century these ranged from factories making silk and lace products to steel mills.

It is no longer in service and is kept permanently empty.

Urbanization

The main axis of the Gier valley today holds an almost continuous urban and industrial area from Terrenoire in Saint-Étienne to Givors on the Rhone.
The main towns from west to east, with their 2010 populations, are Saint-Chamond (35,793), La Grand-Croix (5,070), Lorette (4,498), Rive-de-Gier (14,996) and Givors (19,118).
The 12 towns along the river valley totaled 88,974 inhabitants in 2008. The Gier is partly covered over in Saint-Chamond.

References
Citations

Sources

 

Rivers of France
Rivers of Loire (department)
Rivers of Rhône (department)
Rivers of Auvergne-Rhône-Alpes